The 1992 Wake Forest Demon Deacons football team was an American football team that represented Wake Forest University during the 1992 NCAA Division I-A football season. In its sixth season under head coach Bill Dooley, the team compiled an 8–4 record, finished in a tie for fourth place in the Atlantic Coast Conference, and defeated Oregon in the 1992 Independence Bowl.

Schedule

References

Wake Forest
Wake Forest Demon Deacons football seasons
Independence Bowl champion seasons
Wake Forest Demon Deacons football